Sim Mun-seop (born 2 January 1932) is a South Korean former sports shooter. He competed in the 25 metre pistol event at the 1960 Summer Olympics.

References

External links
 

1932 births
Possibly living people
South Korean male sport shooters
Olympic shooters of South Korea
Shooters at the 1960 Summer Olympics
Sportspeople from Gangwon Province, South Korea